Gary Lough (born 6 July 1970) is a British male former middle-distance runner. He represented his country at the 1995 World Championships in Athletics, finishing the 1500 metres final in ninth place. He won 1500 m bronze medals internationally at the 1993 Summer Universiade and the 1994 European Cup. He also participated at the 1994 IAAF World Cup and the 1996 European Cup.

At the top national level he reached the podium three times. He was third in the 1500 m at the 1993 UK Athletics Championships, third over 800 m at the 1995 AAA Championships, and third in the 1500 m at the 1994 AAA Championships. He was a four-time Northern Irish national champion in the 800 metres, taking straight victories from 1990 to 1993. He was twice champion at the BUCS British Universities Athletics Championships, winning the 1500m title in both 1991 and 1995.

Born in Larne, Moyle Hospital in County Antrim,  Lough attended Loughborough University and it was there that he met fellow student-athlete Paula Radcliffe and the two became friends. Five years after the pair began dating and later married, having two children: a daughter, Isla (2007), and a son, Raphael (2010). Lough suffered a knee injury which curtailed his competitive career and instead focused on training and managing his wife's career. Radcliffe set the world record in the marathon while working with her husband. He drew public criticism for his coaching style after her fourth-place performance at the 2001 World Championships in Athletics. Radcliffe was distraught at missing a medal and Lough's trackside remonstration of her tactics was shown on television. Lough later apologised to his wife and the public for his reaction.

Lough began working with multiple Olympic champion Mo Farah in February 2018, with Farah remarking that he appreciated Lough's strong will and attention to detail as a coach.

Personal bests
1500 metres – 3:34.76 min (1995)
Mile run – 3:55.91 min (1995)
3000 metres – 7:49.45 min (1995)
3000 metres steeplechase – 8:26.33 min (1996)

International competitions

National titles
Northern Irish Athletics Championships
800 m: 1990, 1991, 1992, 1993

References

External links

Living people
1970 births
Sportspeople from County Antrim
British athletics coaches
Sports coaches from Northern Ireland
British male steeplechase runners
Male middle-distance runners from Northern Ireland
World Athletics Championships athletes for Great Britain
Alumni of Loughborough University
Universiade medalists in athletics (track and field)
Universiade bronze medalists for Great Britain
Medalists at the 1993 Summer Universiade